Michael Zepek (born January 19, 1981) is a German former footballer.

External links

1981 births
Living people
German footballers
Germany under-21 international footballers
Germany youth international footballers
Association football defenders
Karlsruher SC II players
Karlsruher SC players
Bayer 04 Leverkusen II players
Rot Weiss Ahlen players
TSG 1899 Hoffenheim players
SV Elversberg players
KSV Hessen Kassel players
2. Bundesliga players